Year 950 (CML) was a common year starting on Tuesday (link will display the full calendar) of the Julian calendar.

Events 
 By place 

 Byzantine Empire 
 Arab–Byzantine War: A Hamdanid army (30,000 men) led by Sayf al-Dawla raids into  Byzantine theme Anatolia. He defeats Bardas Phokas, but is then ambushed on his return and heavily defeated by Leo Phokas.

 Europe 
 November 22 – King Lothair II dies at Turin (possibly poisoned by Berengar of Ivrea). Berengar is crowned king of Italy and imprisons Lothair's now 19-year-old widow, Adelaide for four months at Como.
 Boleslav I, duke of Bohemia, signs a peace treaty with King Otto I of the East Frankish Kingdom. He becomes his ally, but he probably wasn't forced to resume the payment of tribute.
 Henry I, duke of Bavaria, attacks Western Hungary, taking captives and plunder. He enlarges his duchy in the wars with the Hungarians.

 Wales 
 King Hywel Dda ("the Good") dies after an 8-year reign in which he has established codified laws. His three sons Owain ap Hywel Dda, Rhodri ap Hywel, and Edwin ap Hywel divide Wales amongst themselves.

 Oceania 
 The Tu'i Tonga Empire starts to expand in the Pacific Ocean. The Tu'i Tonga kings establish the capital at Mu'a on the island of Tongatapu (approximate date).

 By topic 

 Religion 
 Page with Joshua Leading the Israelites, from the Joshua Roll, is made in Constantinople. It is now kept at the Biblioteca Apostolica Vaticana in Rome (approximate date).

Births 
 June 12 – Reizei, Japanese emperor (d. 1011)
 Bernard I, German nobleman (approximate date) 
 Dedo I, German nobleman (approximate date)
 Egbert, archbishop of Trier (approximate date)
 Emma of Blois, duchess of Aquitaine (d. 1003)
 Erik the Red, Norse Viking explorer (d. 1003)
 Guy of Anderlecht, Christian saint (d. 1012)
 Herbert III, Frankish nobleman (d. 995)
 Ibn Yunus, Fatamid astronomer (d. 1009)
 Lady Finella, Scottish noblewoman (d. 995)
 Lambert I, French nobleman (approximate date)
 Lothair Udo I, German nobleman (d. 994)
 Masako, Japanese empress consort (d. 1000)
 Moninho Viegas, French knight (d. 1022)
 Notker III, German Benedictine monk (d. 1022)
 Odo I (or Eudes), French nobleman (d. 996)
 Otto I, duke of Carinthia (approximate date)
 Reginar IV, French nobleman (approximate date)
 Sarolt, Grand Princess of Hungary (d. 1008)
 Soběslav, Bohemian nobleman (d. 1004)
 William I, French nobleman (approximate date)
 Wolbodo, bishop of Liège (approximate date)

Deaths 
 January 15 – Wang Jingchong, Chinese general
 October 7 – Li, Chinese empress consort
 October – Al-Qahir, Abbasid caliph (b. 899)
 November 22 – Lothair II, king of Italy
 December 24 
 Shi Hongzhao, Chinese general
 Wang Zhang, Chinese official
 Yang Bin, Chinese chancellor
 Ælfric, bishop of Ramsbury (approximate date)
 Al-Farabi, Muslim philosopher (or 951)
 Hywel Dda ("the Good"), king of Wales
 Li Jinquan, Chinese general (approximate date)
 Ricfried, Frankish nobleman (b. 845)
 Sunyer, count of Barcelona, Girona and Ausona
 Zoltán, Grand Prince of Hungary (approximate date)
 Dharma Mahadevi, Indian Queen Regnant

References